The Steel Helmet is a 1951 American war film directed, written, and produced by Samuel Fuller during the Korean War. The cast stars Gene Evans, Robert Hutton, Steve Brodie, James Edwards, and Richard Loo. It was the first American film about the war, and the first of several war films by Fuller.

Plot
A U.S. Army unit surrenders to the North Koreans; they are then bound and summarily executed. Only Sergeant Zack survives the massacre, saved when the bullet meant for him is deflected by his helmet. He is freed by a South Korean orphan, who he dubs "Short Round", who tags along despite Zack's annoyance. Short Round confronts American racial attitudes when he demands that Zack refer to him as South Korean, not a gook.

They come across Corporal Thompson, a black 19th Infantry medic and also the sole survivor of his platoon. Then they encounter a patrol led by inexperienced Lieutenant Driscoll. The racial angle arises when white soldiers suggest that the black medic was a deserter. But soon after, a battlefield emergency demands interracial unity when the men are pinned down by snipers. Together, Zack and Sergeant Tanaka dispatch the snipers. Zack reluctantly agrees to help the unit establish an observation post at a Buddhist temple. One GI is shortly thereafter killed by a booby trap.

They reach the apparently deserted temple without further incident, but Joe is killed that night by a North Korean major hiding there. The officer is eventually captured. He tries without success to subvert first Thompson, then Tanaka, by pointing out the racism they face in 1950s America. Sergeant Zack prepares to take his prize back for questioning, cynically looking forward to a furlough as a reward. Before he leaves, Driscoll asks to exchange helmets for luck, but Zack turns him down. Then Short Round is killed by another sniper. After the major mocks the wish the boy had written down (a prayer to Buddha to have Zack like him), Zack loses control and shoots the prisoner, who dies soon after.

Then the unit spots the North Koreans on the move and calls down devastating artillery strikes. When the enemy realize the artillery is being directed from the temple, they attack in large numbers, supported by a tank. The attack is repelled, but only Zack, Tanaka, Thompson, and the radio operator survive. When they are relieved, Zack responds to the question, "What outfit are you?" with the statement, "US infantry." As they leave the temple, Zack goes to Driscoll's grave and exchanges his helmet with the one marking the man's grave.

Cast

 Gene Evans as Sergeant Zack
 Robert Hutton as Private Bronte
 Steve Brodie as Lieutenant Driscoll
 James Edwards as Corporal Thompson
 Richard Loo as Sergeant Tanaka
 Sid Melton as Joe
 Richard Monahan as Private Baldy
 William Chun as "Short Round"
 Harold Fong as The Red
 Neyle Morrow as First GI
 Lynn Stalmaster as Second Lieutenant

Production
In October 1950, Fuller made his film in ten days with twenty-five extras who were UCLA students and a plywood tank, in a studio using mist, and exteriors shot in Griffith Park for $104,000.

According to Ben Mankiewicz of Turner Classic Movies, Fuller wrote the script in a week. The Steel Helmet grossed more than $2 million.

The Steel Helmet confronts American racism when a North Korean Communist prisoner baits a black soldier in conversation with accounts of American society's Jim Crow rules. Moreover, the Korean soldier makes the first-ever mention, in a Hollywood film, of the internment of Japanese Americans in World War II.  The film infuriated the military, who had provided assistance in the form of military stock footage.  Army personnel summoned Fuller for a conference on the film. The U.S. Army was upset over Zack's shooting of a prisoner of war. Fuller replied that in his World War II service it frequently happened, and had his former commanding officer, Brigadier General George A. Taylor, telephone the Pentagon to confirm it. The Communist newspaper The Daily Worker condemned The Steel Helmet as a right-wing fantasy.

Fuller cast Gene Evans, refusing a major studio's interest in filming The Steel Helmet with John Wayne as Sergeant Zack. Fuller threatened to quit when the producers wanted Evans replaced by Larry Parks. Mickey Knox claimed to have been Fuller's first choice for Zack, but he turned the film down.

Reception
The Steel Helmet was met with critical acclaim with much praise going to Fuller's directing. The film has a perfect rating of 100% on Rotten Tomatoes based on 13 reviews.

Bosley Crowther of The New York Times opened his review by stating, "For an obviously low-budget picture that was shot in a phenomenally short time, Samuel Fuller's metallic The Steel Helmet has some surprisingly good points." Crowther praised Fuller for having "sidestepped the romantic war clichés" and making a good effort to "create something like the reported climate" of the Korean War, but did fault the staging and sets as "patently artificial."
 
The reviewer at Variety magazine wrote of the film, "The Steel Helmet pinpoints the Korean fighting in a grim, hardhitting tale that is excellently told", and went on to say that it also "serves to introduce Gene Evans as the sergeant, a vet of World War II, a tough man who is interested in staying alive, and hardened to the impact of warfare. Robert Hutton, conscientious objector in the last war but now willing to fight against communism; Steve Brodie, the lieutenant who used pull to stay out of combat previously; James Edwards, the Negro medic, and Richard Loo, a heroic Nisei, are the other principals who add to the rugged realism."

Harrison's Reports wrote that the film was "destined to take its place among the best war pictures ever produced. It has been directed by Samuel Fuller so skillfully that the spectator's attention is held in a vise from the beginning to the end."

John McCarten of The New Yorker was less enthusiastic about the film than most other critics, deeming it "no better and no worse than the usual Hollywood treatment of such matters." The Monthly Film Bulletin in the UK was also dismissive, calling it "inevitably a rough job. Much of the film bears evidence of having been shot in the studio, and the jungle sequences in particular fail to ring true."

Among more recent assessments, Dave Kehr of the Chicago Reader wrote that "Sam Fuller's first major accomplishment is a grim piece of agitprop set in the Korean War, where a battle-worn American sergeant (Gene Evans) forms a survival pact with a Korean orphan. Fuller's powerful direction turns a trite story into a vivid study of national and personal identity." In 1998, Jonathan Rosenbaum of the Chicago Reader included the film in his unranked list of the best American films not included on the AFI Top 100.

The critics of Time Out magazine said the film is "A characteristically hard-hitting war movie from Fuller, charting the fortunes of Gene Evans' Sergeant Zack, sole survivor of a POW massacre in Korea. Saved by a Korean orphan and joining up with other GIs cut off from their units, Evans' cynical veteran embodies the writer-director's abiding thesis that, to survive the madness of war, a ruthless individualism is necessary. Fuller glamorises neither his loner protagonist nor the war itself: if he clearly supports the US presence in Korea, battle is still a chaotic, deadly affair, and nobody has much idea of why they fight. The action scenes are terrific, belying the movie's very low budget."

Leonard Maltin of Turner Classic Movies Online in his glowing review awarded the film with 3 1/2 out of 4 stars and said "Samuel Fuller. Gene Evans, Robert Hutton, Steve Brodie, James Edwards, Richard Loo, Sid Melton. Evans is a gutsy American sergeant caught in dizzying turn of events in early days of Korean war; it's a solid melodrama written by Fuller, with a surprisingly contemporary view of war itself." Sean Axmaker also of Turner Classic Movies Online wrote that The Steel Helmet is "The first American film about the Korean War [and] one of the greatest war films ever made."

References

External links
 
 
 
 The Steel Helmet on Criterion Collection
 
 

1951 films
1951 war films
American war films
Asian-American war films
1950s English-language films
Korean War films
Films directed by Samuel Fuller
United States in the Korean War
Lippert Pictures films
Films scored by Paul Dunlap
American black-and-white films
1950s American films